CineTel can refer to:

CineTel Films, an independent film distributor
CineTel Productions, which became Scripps Productions after being bought out by E. W. Scripps Company